Leland is a city in Washington County, Mississippi, United States.  It is located within the Mississippi Delta, on the banks of Deer Creek. The population was 4,481 at the 2010 census. It was once a railway town and had long been a center of cotton culture, which is still an important commodity crop in the rural area. It was once considered the second-largest city in Washington County in 1920 due to its rapid growth of residents, businesses, and schools.

Since before the Civil War, farming has been the basis of the local economy. There are several privately-owned farms within and around the boundaries of the town. Mississippi State University and the United States Department of Agriculture (USDA) maintain an agriculture research station at Stoneville on Leland's outskirts. Other agricultural companies in the area are Lauren Farms BASF Stoneville Cotton, Bayer Crops Science, GreenPoint Ag, Azlin Seed Service, Corteva Agriscience™,  Pettiet Agricultural Services, Inc., Nutrien Ag SolutionsTM,  K-I Chemical U.S.A., Greenland Planting Company,  Ayers-Delta Implement,  Edward's Flying Service, Essie Patterson Farm Trucking, and Southern Seed Association. Cotton, soybeans, rice and corn are the leading commodity crops along with catfish.

A number of national and regionally noted blues musicians are from Leland. There are five Mississippi Blues Trail markers in Leland commemorating the small town's significant contribution to blues history. Highway 61, mentioned in numerous blues recordings, runs through the town and gives its name to the community's blues museum. Leland is the burial place of the folk artist and blues musician James "Son" Thomas, who lived for many years near the railroad tracks. Thomas is buried beneath a gravestone donated by Mt. Zion Memorial Fund, to which musician John Fogerty of Creedence Clearwater Revival was a yearly contributor.

Blues musician Johnny Winter spent part of his childhood in Leland.  Winter's grandfather and father, a former mayor of Leland, operated J.D. Winter & Sons, a cotton business. One of the Blues Trail markers in Leland is dedicated to Winter.

The community is the childhood home of puppeteer Jim Henson, who was born in nearby Greenville, but raised in Leland. Here he created the character of Kermit the Frog, a Muppet. The city has a museum along the banks of Deer Creek celebrating Henson's accomplishments called the Jim Henson Exhibit.

Leland was selected as the site for the Mississippi Wildlife Heritage Museum, opened in 2016.

History

1800-1900: Founding 
The area in which Leland sits was once part of the Choctaw territory in the early 1800s. After the Second Choctaw Cession, which came from the Treaty of Doak’s Stand of 1820, the land was fought over by the United States government and the Choctaw Indians during the American Civil War in which the Choctaw Indians sided with the Confederacy in order to fight the Union for the return of their land. 

The territory that the town was built on was first settled on in 1834 by Samuel and Susan Jones, Mary Neely, and Malinda Breeland. A few years later, they deeded the land to the families of Connerly and Buckner. They made their home on the bank of Deer Creek on the Three Oaks Plantation. Soon other settlers came to live in Leland and the Stoneville area. To travel between both places at the time, people used boats to navigate on Deer Creek. There was even a drawbridge that wad built by Leland settlers to be more closely connected with the people of Stoneville.

Years later, the Buckner and Connerly families moved away and sold their land to Judge James Ruckus and William Yerger. The new owners maintained the land until the American Civil War. In 1869, their heirs quit claimed the land for release mortgages which passed to the hands of the Bank of Kentucky. After seven years, Mississippi native Captain James Alexander Ventress Feltus (1840-1908) bought the 900 acres of land for $12,000.

Captain James A.V. Feltus built his home at the “Three Oaks” and deeded a 100 foot right-of-way on the land to the Memphis and Vicksburg Railroad Company; however, no railway was built until 1885, when the right of way was given to the Louisville, New Orleans and Texas Railroad Company. Leland was one of two cities considered for a terminus of several railroad lines, most notably, the Louisville, New Orleans & Texas Railway. Captain John C. Calhoun, an enterprising and liberal owner of the Leland Plantation, pushed efforts to make Leland a primary candidate for the terminus.

Captain Feltus dedicated the original town of Leland by signing deeds that created streets from First to Eighth Streets, which included Main and Broad Streets as the east and west boundaries of the town. Accounts state that Captain Feltus named the town after Miss Leland McCutcheon, the mother of Feltus’ friend, Ruben Armstrong and fiancé of young traveling railroad auditor C.E. Armstrong. It would seem that both accounts state that both men asked Captain Feltus to name the town in her honor. The first store built in the town of Leland was the Greenley’s Mens Store, owned by J.C. Greenley. 

In January of 1886, the citizens of the town drafted a charter to incorporate the town of Leland and sent it by mail to the representatives at Jackson, Mississippi. By February of that year, the charter was amended in bills H.B. 642 and H.B. 643 and was well on its way to making the town officially recognized as a city; it was approved on February 20, 1886.  

As the town continued to progress, it established its first newspaper publication, The Leland Record, and businesses became established, e.g. retail, banks, law firms, other railway companies, grocers, innkeepers, landlords and more.

Geography

Demographics

2020 census

As of the 2020 United States Census, there were 3,988 people, 1,642 households, and 1,032 families residing in the city.

2013 ACS
As of the 2013 American Community Survey, there were 4,427 people living in the city. 74.3% were African American, 24.8% White, 0.1% Native American, 0.6% Asian, 0.1% from some other race and 0.2% from two or more races. 0.4% were Hispanic or Latino of any race.

2000 census
As of the census of 2000, there were 5,502 people, 1,943 households, and 1,414 families living in the city. The population density was 2,670.2 people per square mile (1,031.2/km2). There were 2,095 housing units at an average density of 1,016.7 per square mile (392.7/km2). The racial makeup of the city was 32.01% White, 67.01% African American, 0.16% Native American, 0.13% Asian, 0.04% from other races, and 0.65% from two or more races. Hispanic or Latino of any race were 0.75% of the population.

There were 1,943 households, out of which 36.9% had children under the age of 18 living with them, 38.9% were married couples living together, 27.7% had a female householder with no husband present, and 27.2% were non-families. 24.2% of all households were made up of individuals, and 11.1% had someone living alone who was 65 years of age or older. The average household size was 2.82 and the average family size was 3.35.

In the city, the population was spread out, with 31.9% under the age of 18, 10.6% from 18 to 24, 26.3% from 25 to 44, 18.8% from 45 to 64, and 12.4% who were 65 years of age or older. The median age was 30 years. For every 100 females, there were 88.1 males. For every 100 females age 18 and over, there were 78.6 males.

The median income for a household in the city was $25,678, and the median income for a family was $28,926. Males had a median income of $26,184 versus $20,693 for females. The per capita income for the city was $11,681. About 24.0% of families and 27.5% of the population were below the poverty line.

Arts and culture

Places of Interest 
 Mississippi Blues Trail Markers
 Mississippi Wildlife Heritage Museum
 Jim Henson Exhibit
The Thompson House

Education
The City of Leland is served by the Leland School District. Leland High School is the sole high school. Leland School Park is the sole middle school. Edna M. Scott Elementary is the sole elementary school.

Media 
The Leland Progress is the paper of record. Previous papers were the Leland Record (est.1886) and the Leland Enterprise (est.1901).

Infrastructure

Health Care 
The Witte Clinic and hospital served the Leland area from 1946 to 1949. It was then leased out to the city and named The Leland City Hospital in 1949 for a year. While no longer a hospital system since the 1980s, this facility is now named the Leland Medical Clinic.

Notable people 
James "Son" Thomas, blues musician, gravedigger, and sculptor.
 Douglas A. Blackmon, Pulitzer Prize-winning author of Slavery by Another Name, grew up in Leland.
 Johnie Cooks, former college and professional football player at Mississippi State University and the NFL, is from Leland.
 Jim Henson, puppeteer and creator of The Muppets, grew up in Leland.
 Thelma Houston, singer/actress, was born in Leland.
 Antonio Johnson, professional football player.
 Wadada Leo Smith, a jazz trumpeter and composer, is from Leland.
 Bob Taylor, baseball player.
 Johnny Winter, blues musician, spent part of his childhood in Leland.
 Matt Miller graduated at Leland High School in 1990; He was a former Major League Pitcher who has since retired.
 Eddie Cusic, blues musician, was born in Wilmot, near Leland, where he spent most of his life.
 Ruth Thompson Dickins, socialite and convicted murderer.

In popular culture 
A scene from the crime comedy drama movie, “O Brother, Where Art thou (2000)” was filmed in Leland on the Columbus & Greenville Railway. In the scene, the three escaping convicts try to jump aboard a freight train only to fail and catch a handcar driven by a blind old man who makes wild predictions about their future.

References

Further reading
Leland, Mississippi: The Village That Raised Me (2021) by Velma P. Allen
Southern Cultures (2013) by James G. Thomas Jr.
A Place Called Mississippi (2013) by David G. Sansing 
Washington County, Mississippi (2002)  by Russell S. Hall, Princella W. Nowell, Stacy Childress.
Discovering Mississippi: A Mississippi Studies Textbook (1993) by John Ray Skates, David G. Sansing, and Mary Ann Wells
Leland, Mississippi: From Hellhole to Beauty Spot (1986) by Dorothy Love Turk.
75 Years in Leland (1974) by Noel Workman.

External links

Chamber of Commerce

Cities in Mississippi
Cities in Washington County, Mississippi